Ulovo is a rural locality (a selo) in Pavlovskoye Rural Settlement, Suzdalsky District, Vladimir Oblast, Russia. The population was 17 as of 2010. There are 10 streets.

Geography 
Ulovo is located on the Ulovka River, 26 km southeast of Suzdal (the district's administrative centre) by road. Poretskoye is the nearest rural locality.

References 

Rural localities in Suzdalsky District
Suzdalsky Uyezd